"Do Ya Thang" is the second single from Ice Cube's eighth solo studio album, Raw Footage released August 19. It was released with a music video on his website on July 1, 2008.

Release

Do Ya Thang was released onto iTunes on June 24, 2008. The video has had over 8 million YouTube views.

Charts

References

2008 singles
Ice Cube songs
Songs written by Ice Cube
2008 songs
Music videos directed by Dale Resteghini